Cabin by the Sea is the second studio album released by American reggae band The Dirty Heads on June 19, 2012.

The first single, "Spread Too Thin", premiered on KROQ at 4:20 on March 9, 2012 and was released on iTunes on March 13.

Track listing

References

2012 albums
Dirty Heads albums
Five Seven Music albums